Hamlet Handley (1873 – 27 October 1918) was an English footballer who played for Burslem Port Vale in the 1890s.

Career
Handley joined Burslem Port Vale in August 1895 and scored on his debut; in a 2–0 win at Rotherham Town on 7 September 1895. He lost his place at the Athletic Ground the next month after a total of five Second Division appearances, and was released at the end of the season.

Personal life
Handley served as a private in the North Staffordshire Regiment during the First World War and died on active service on 27 October 1918. He is buried at Burslem Cemetery in Stoke-on-Trent.

Career statistics
Source:

References

1873 births
1918 deaths
Sportspeople from Burslem
English footballers
Association football wingers
Port Vale F.C. players
English Football League players
British Army personnel of World War I
North Staffordshire Regiment soldiers
British military personnel killed in World War I
Military personnel from Staffordshire